Sri Lankan Australians are people of Sri Lankan heritage living in Australia; this includes Sri Lankans by birth and by ancestry. Sri Lankan Australians constitute one of the largest groups of Overseas Sri Lankan communities and are the largest diasporic Sri Lankan community in Oceania. Sri Lankan Australians consist of people with Sinhalese, Tamil, Moor, Burgher, Malay and Chinese origins among others.

History

Early arrivals
Recorded Sri Lankan immigration to Australia started in 1816, with the transportation of Drum Major William O'Dean (a Sri Lankan Malay) and his wife Eve (a Sinhalese). Early immigrants from Sri Lanka (at that time known as Ceylon) were generally (unlike the O'Deans) absorbed into the Aboriginal population. Other early references of Sri Lankan migration date back to the 1870s when authorities in South Australia sought out the possibility of importing labour from Ceylon. The first Sinhalese from Sri Lanka arrived in 1870 to work in sugarcane plantations in Queensland. A community was believed to exist on Thursday Island in 1876. In 1882, a group of 500 left Colombo for Queensland, mostly in Mackay.

20th century

Under the White Australia policy, immigration was negligible. It resumed after the Second World War primarily involving migration of Burghers, who fulfilled the then criteria that they should be of predominantly European ancestry and that their appearance should be European. By 1954 around 2000 Sri Lankans had been accepted. Sinhalese migration began in the 1960s but it was after the mid-1970s that large groups arrived, which also included Christians and Buddhists. During the 1970s intake restrictions loosened and Sri Lankan students undertook courses in Australia as part of the Colombo Plan prior to the formal dismantling of the White Australia policy, and after 1973 and from the early 1980s Sinhalese, Tamil and Moor migration resumed and increased.

Present
In The Australian People, S. Pinnawala writes that "social interaction between the various Sri Lankan migrant groups has often been influenced by factors originating in their home country".

In the 1980s, on a reflection of ethnic unrest in Sri Lanka, tensions between the Sinhalese and Tamil communities grew. However, in Pinnawala's opinion, more recently a Sri Lankan identity has developed among the various religious and ethnic migrants.

This has led to many new community organisations being established to promote Sri Lankan culture and traditions. There have also been strong links formed between Sinhalese Buddhists now living in Australia and their co-religionists from Burma, Thailand and Cambodia. Similar trends can be traced between Christian migrants from Sri Lanka who now live in Australia.

Demographics

Sri Lankan Australians are the 10th largest ethnic group in Australia, numbering 86,412. The city of Melbourne contains just under half of the Sri Lankan Australians. Fewer than 20% are estimated to live outside New South Wales and Victoria.

The number of Sri Lankan Australians counted in 1996, including the second-generation, was 64,068. The 2011 census recorded 86,412 Sri Lankans born in Australia.

The rate of assimilation among Sri Lankan Australians is fairly high: among second-generation immigrants, the 'in-marriage' rate was extremely low – 5.6% for brides and 3.0% for grooms.

Sinhalese Australians have an exceptionally low rate of return migration to Sri Lanka. In December 2001, the Department of Foreign Affairs estimated that there were 800 Australian citizens resident in Sri Lanka. It is unclear whether these were returning Sri Lankan emigrants with Australian citizenship, their Sri Lankan Australian children, or other Australians present on business or for some other reason.

Tamils in Australia numbered 19,426 in the 2011 Census. The majority of Tamils born in Sri Lanka came to Australia after 1983 when Sri Lanka faced ethnic turmoil and unrest (Black July). The Western suburbs of Sydney and the South Eastern Suburbs of Melbourne have a relatively high number of Tamil speaking people. There were 73161 Tamil speakers according to the 2016 Census, with the largest proportion of people across Australia in the Western Sydney suburb of Westmead (1,425 people, or 3.6% of people in that suburb), followed by Toongabbie (1,404 people, or 3.5% of people in that suburb). Numerous Tamil schools and Hindu Temples have been established in all main cities to cater for the growing Sri Lankan Tamil population.

Language
In 2006, there were 29,055 Australians who spoke Sinhalese at home. SBS Radio is available in Sinhalese, and Melbourne television channel Channel 31 runs the Sri Lankan Morning show, which has sections in Sinhalese.

Religion
Most Sinhalese in Australia are Theravada Buddhists, and a small percentage of Sinhalese follow branches of Christianity. Sri Lankans have established many Theravada Buddhist temples across Victoria, New South Wales, Queensland and South Australia including the Dhamma Sarana Buddhist Temple of Melbourne's eastern suburbs.

The majority of Sri Lankan Tamils are Hindu. The Sydney Murugan Temple was constructed for the needs of the high Tamil population in Western Sydney. Smaller temples have been built in the greater Sydney area. The Siva Vishnu Temple in Carrum Downs south east of Melbourne is also a temple built by Sri Lankan Tamils. The Sunshine Murugan Temple in western Melbourne also caters to the Tamil community. In other cities such as Adelaide, Brisbane, Perth, Townsville, Darwin, Canberra and Hobart, Hindu temples have also been built.

Culture
Popularly celebrated community festivals include Sri Lankan Independence Day (4 February) and Sri Lankan New Year (14 April). Sri Lankan restaurants are becoming a popular feature of shopping strips in Melbourne, Hawthorn, Brunswick, Northcote, Glen Waverley and Dandenong, while Sri Lankan Australian media is also growing with newspapers, television and radio stations broadcasting cultural programs.

Community

Australia 

Events

 Lankan Fest - Sri Lankan cultural show in Melbourne

Organizations
 Global Sri Lankan Forum
 Sri Lanka German Technical Training Institute - Old boys Association Australia Inc.
 Sri Lankan Study Centre for the Advancement of Technology & Social Welfare Inc (SCATS), Australia (1992)
 Australia Sri Lanka Council (1994)
 Committee for Sri Lanka (1993)
 Sri Lanka Podujana Peramuna Australia Inc.
 Multicultural Human Power Incorporated
 United Sri Lankan Muslim Association (1990)

Websites
 TamilAustralian.com
 srilankadirectory.com.au
 ozsrilanka.com.au
 ausnewslanka.com
 lankacube.com
 ozlanka.com

Canberra
 Sri Lanka Dhamma Vihara Association of Canberra
 Lankans Canberra Foundation 
 Sri Lanka High Commissions
 Sinhala Cultural Association of Canberra

New South Wales
Organizations
 Austra-Lanka Muslims Association (ALMA)
 Sinhala Association of NSW
 Sinhalese Cultural Forum of NSW
 Sri Lankan Australian Malay Association (SLAMA)
 The Sri Lanka Association of NSW
 University of Colombo Alumni Association NSW Inc.

Radio
 SBS Radio 2 (Sydney 97.7 fm)
 SBS Radio 2 (Wollongong 1035 am)

Victoria

Events
 Lankan Fest - Sri Lankan cultural show in Melbourne

Organizations
 Association of Sri Lankan Muslims in Australia (ASLAMA)
 Black & Gold of Victoria - D.S. Senanayake College Old Boys Association
 Federation of Ethnic Communities' Councils of Australia
 Good Shepherd Convent Colombo Past Pupils' Association
 Katherine Keegel Children's Fund (KKCF)
 Northern Melbourne Sri Lankan Senior's Association Inc.
 Royal College Old Boys Association
 Nalandians In Sydney - Nalanda College Old Boys Association, Sydney, Australia (NIS)
 Nalanda College Old Boys Association, Melbourne, Australia 
 Nalanda College Old Boys Association, Queensland, Australia 
 Nalanda College Old Boys Association, Perth, Australia 
 Sinhalese Cultural and Community Service Foundation
 Society for Peace Unity and Human Rights for Sri Lanka (SPUR)
 Sri Lankan Association of Victoria (formerly the Ceylon Club of Australia)
 Sri Lankan Study Centre for the Advancement of Technology and Social Welfare
 St. Joseph's College Old Boys Union, the biggest alumni association based on a Sri Lankan school in Australia
 Trinity College Old Boys Association
 United Sri Lankan Muslim Association of Australia (USMAA)
Maris Stella College OBA Melbourne Branch
 Visakha Vidyalaya Past Pupils Association (VVPPA)
 Kelaniya University Alumni Association Australia
 Anula Vidyalaya Past Pupils Association Victoria (AVPPAV)
 St Benedict's College Old Boys Union

South Australia (Adelaide)
Organizations
 Adelaide Sri Lanka Buddhist Vihara
 Adelaide Sri Lankan Community

Newspapers
 Hiru Kirana (Sinhala)
 Pahana (Sinhala)
 Sannasa (Sinhala)

TV
 One World Sri Lanka (Channel 31)
 Sri Lanka Clip Show (Channel 31)
 Sri Lanka Morning Show (Channel 31)
 Sri Lanka Today (Channel 31)
 TV Sri Lanka (Channel 31)

Radio
 SBS Radio 2 (93.1 fm)

Western Australia
Organizations
 AusLanka Charity Foundation 
 Sri Lankan Australian Youth Association 
 Sri Lankan Buddhist Vihara Perth Western Australia
 Sri Lankan Cultural Society of Western Australia 
 Sri Lankan Muslim Society of Western Australia Inc.

Northern Territory
 The Buddhist Society of the N.T.
 Sri Lanka Australia Friendship Association

Notable Sri Lankan Australians

See also

 Australia – Sri Lanka relations
 Colombo Plan
 Tamil Australians

Notes

References

Further reading
Information about Sri Lankans in Australia can be obtained from the following publications.
 Gamage, S. 'Curtains of culture, ethnicity, and class: changing composition of the Sri Lankan community in Australia, Journal of intercultural studies, vol 19(1), 1998,pp. 37–56.
 Gamage, S. 2001. Sinhalese in Australia, in The Australian people – An Encyclopedia of the nation, its people and their origins(ed) James Jupp, 2nd edition, Cambridge University Press,Cambridge, pp, 684–685.
 Gamage, S. 2002. Adaptation Experiences of Sri Lankan Immigrants and their Children in Australia in the Context of Multiculturalism and Anglo-Conformity, in Annette Richardson and Michael Wyness (eds) Exploring Cultural Perspectives: Integration and Globalization, International Cultural Research Network (ICRN) Press, Edmonton, pp. 3–29.
 Gamage, S. 2014. Life of Sri Lankans in Australia: identity, lifestyle and dilemmas of living between two cultures, Island (29.01.2014), Colombo.
 Reeves, P. 2014. The Encyclopedia of the Sri Lankan Diaspora, Editions Didier Millet Pty Ltd. Singapore.

External links
 The Australian People
 Dispersion of Sri Lankan Australians in Australia
 First Ceylonese family to Australia
 DIMIA – Community Information Summary
 The Sri Lanka-born Community
 Sri Lankan Cultural Profile

Asian Australian
Immigration to Australia
 
Sri Lankan diaspora